Worth is an unincorporated community in Turner County, in the U.S. state of Georgia.

History
A post office called Worth was established in 1890, and remained in operation until 1931.

The Georgia General Assembly incorporated Worth in 1910.  The town's municipal charter was repealed in 1943.

References

Former municipalities in Georgia (U.S. state)
Unincorporated communities in Georgia (U.S. state)
Unincorporated communities in Turner County, Georgia